Pyhä-Häkki National Park (Pyhä-Häkin kansallispuisto) is a national park in Central Finland. Its foundation was planned already in the late 1930s, but the Second World War interrupted these plans.

The national park protects old Scots pine and Norway spruce copses, which started growing when Finland was still under Swedish rule, and bogs, which comprise half of the national park. The national park is the largest remaining area of virgin forest in the southern half of Finland. In addition to the pine and the spruce, Betula pendula, Betula pubescens, Populus tremula, and Alnus glutinosa (the latter along some creeks) are the taller tree species encountered in the national park.

See also 
 List of national parks of Finland
 Protected areas of Finland

References

External links
 
 Outdoors.fi – Pyhä-Häkki National Park
 The park's unofficial webpage

National parks of Finland
Protected areas established in 1956
Geography of Central Finland
Tourist attractions in Central Finland Region
Old-growth forests